Maresi is a 1948 Austrian period drama film directed by Hans Thimig and starring Attila Hörbiger, Maria Schell and Siegfried Breuer. It was one of the box offices successes of 1948.

The film was based on the 1935 story of the same title by the Austrian writer Alexander Lernet-Holenia (1897 - 1976).

The film's sets were designed by the art director Julius von Borsody.

Cast
 Attila Hörbiger as Franz von Hübner 
 Maria Schell as Blanka von Steinville
 Siegfried Breuer as Tabakovitsch 
 Helene Croy as Frau von Hübner 
 Franz Pfaudler as Graf Steinville 
 Maria Olszewska as Gräfin Steinville 
 Alfred Neugebauer as Erzherzog Franz Ferdinand
 Anton Pointner as Der Oberst 
 Georg Tressler as Der Richter 
 Josef Albin as Kriminalinspektor Weniger 
 Camillo Kossuth as Der Diener Ferdinand 
 Max Schipper as Der Reitbursche Johann 
 Gretl Müller-Morelli as Madame Elektra 
 Hugo Lindinger as Ein dicker Fleischhauer 
 Eduard Loibner as Matthias Loy - ein Kutscher
 Franz Muxeneder as Hausdiener bei Franz von Hübner

References

Bibliography 
 Fritsche, Maria. Homemade Men in Postwar Austrian Cinema: Nationhood, Genre and Masculinity. Berghahn Books, 2013.
 Von Dassanowsky, Robert. Austrian Cinema: A History. McFarland, 2005.

External links 
 

1948 films
Austrian historical drama films
1940s historical drama films
1940s German-language films
Films directed by Hans Thimig
Austrian black-and-white films
Films about horses
Films set in the 1910s
Films set in the 1920s
Cultural depictions of Archduke Franz Ferdinand of Austria
Sascha-Film films